Pokachevo is a rural locality (a selo) in Grayvoronsky District, Belgorod Oblast, Russia. The population was 692 as of 2010. There are 11 streets.

Geography 
Pokachevo is located 25 km northwest of Grayvoron (the district's administrative centre) by road. Sankovo and Smorodino are the nearest rural localities.

References 

Rural localities in Grayvoronsky District